Ernie Hartlieb (born April 11, 1979) is a retired American ice hockey left wing who primarily played  with the Florida Everblades of the ECHL.  Hartlieb played college hockey for Miami University, earning the Terry Flanagan Memorial Award in 1999 from the CCHA, for demonstrating "perseverance, dedication and courage while overcoming severe adversity" as Hartlieb overcame a severe head injury suffered on the ice in 1997, comatose as a result for 11 days, and went on to a stellar career with the RedHawks.

Hartlieb has competed with the United States men's national inline hockey team at the IIHF InLine Hockey World Championship, winning a gold medal and an individual scoring title and Tournament "Best Defensemen" in 2004., and a silver medal and "Best Defenseman" award in 2009.

Career statistics

Regular season and playoffs

Honors
Hartlieb's jersey number with the Florida Everblades, 9, was retired in a ceremony before a game against the Orlando Solar Bears on October 19, 2012. Hartlieb was presented with an ECHL Championship ring (he filled in on with the team in the 2011-12 regular season, but did not appear in the playoffs), and hoisted the Kelly Cup. A banner made with his jersey number 9, was hung to the rafters of Germain Arena next to the banners for Reggie Berg and Tom Buckley.

References

External links

1979 births
American men's ice hockey left wingers
Arkansas RiverBlades players
Dayton Bombers players
Florida Everblades players
Grand Rapids Griffins players
Living people
Lowell Lock Monsters players
Miami RedHawks men's ice hockey players
Rochester Americans players
Worcester IceCats players